The  is a ruined sixteenth-century Renaissance château at Nantouillet, in the Seine-et-Marne department of the Île-de-France region of north-central France. It was built on the site of an earlier fortress by the French cardinal and politician Antoine Duprat, who died there on 15 July 1535. It was classed as a historic monument in 1862.

See also
 List of castles in France
 List of châteaux in the Île-de-France

References

External links

 

Châteaux in Seine-et-Marne
Castles in Île-de-France
Monuments historiques of Île-de-France
Tourist attractions in Seine-et-Marne